The 2019 Georgia Bulldogs football team represented the University of Georgia in the 2019 NCAA Division I FBS football season. The Bulldogs played their home games at Sanford Stadium in Athens, Georgia, and competed in the Eastern Division of the Southeastern Conference (SEC). They were led by fourth-year head coach Kirby Smart.

Georgia began the year ranked third in the AP Poll, and were considered the favorite to represent the East Division in the SEC Championship Game for a third consecutive year. On September 21, the team secured a win over then-No. 7 Notre Dame, 23–17. They suffered their first loss of the year when they were upset by unranked South Carolina at home. Georgia rebounded with wins over highly ranked rivals No. 6 Florida and No. 12 Auburn, and ended the regular season atop the East Division with an 11–1 record, 7–1 in SEC play, and ranked fourth in the College Football Playoff rankings. In the SEC Championship Game, Georgia fell to West Division champion and eventual national champion LSU, 37–10. Georgia fell out of contention for the Playoff and received a bid to the Sugar Bowl to play Big 12 Conference runner-up Baylor, which Georgia won 26–14. The Bulldogs were ranked fourth in the season's final polls.

Georgia led FBS in scoring defense, but was 49th in scoring offense. Safety J. R. Reed and offensive tackle Andrew Thomas were named consensus All-Americans. Kicker Rodrigo Blankenship was the recipient of the Lou Groza Award as the nation's best placekicker. Quarterback Jake Fromm led the team in passing with 2,860 yards and 24 touchdowns. Running back D'Andre Swift led the team in rushing with 1,218 yards.

Preseason

SEC Media Days
The 2019 SEC Media Days were held July 15–18 in Birmingham, Alabama. In the preseason media poll, Georgia was projected to repeat as East Division Champion and SEC runner-up.

Preseason All-SEC teams
The Bulldogs had eleven players selected to the preseason all-SEC teams.

Offense

1st team

D'Andre Swift – RB

Andrew Thomas – OL

2nd team

Jake Fromm – QB

Solomon Kindley – OL

Isaiah Wilson – OL

3rd team

Charlie Woerner – TE

Ben Cleveland – OL

Defense

1st team

J. R. Reed – DB

3rd team

Tyler Clark – DL

Richard LeCounte – DB

Specialists

1st team

Rodrigo Blankenship – K

Schedule
Georgia announced its 2019 football schedule on September 18, 2018. The 2019 schedule consists of 7 home and 4 away games in the regular season along with a neutral site game.

Schedule Source:

Roster

Game summaries

at Vanderbilt

Murray State

Arkansas State

#7 Notre Dame

at Tennessee

South Carolina

Kentucky

vs. Florida

Missouri

at Auburn

Texas A&M

at Georgia Tech

vs. LSU (SEC Championship)

Sources:

Statistics

vs. Baylor (Sugar Bowl)

Rankings

Players drafted into the NFL

References

Georgia
Georgia Bulldogs football seasons
Sugar Bowl champion seasons
Georgia Bulldogs football